The EAR 58 class was a class of  gauge  Garratt-type articulated steam locomotives built by Beyer, Peacock & Co. in Manchester, England, in 1949.

The eighteen members of the class were ordered by the Kenya-Uganda Railway (KUR) immediately after World War II, and were a slightly modified, oil-burning version of the KUR's existing coal-fired EC3 class.  By the time the new locomotives were built and entered service, the KUR had been succeeded by the East African Railways (EAR), which designated the coal-fired EC3s as its 57 class, and the new, oil-burning EC3s as its 58 class.

Class list
The numbers and build dates of each member of the class were as follows:

See also

Rail transport in Kenya
Rail transport in Uganda

References

Notes

Bibliography

External links

Beyer, Peacock locomotives
East African Railways locomotives
Garratt locomotives
Metre gauge steam locomotives
Railway locomotives introduced in 1949
Steam locomotives of Kenya
Steam locomotives of Uganda
4-8-4+4-8-4 locomotives
Scrapped locomotives